Bruno Armirail (born 11 April 1994) is a French cyclist, who currently rides for UCI WorldTeam . He is The 2022 french national time trial champion.

Major results

2013
 2nd Time trial, National Under–23 Road Championships
 2nd Chrono des Nations U23
 2nd Biran Grand Prix
2014
 1st  Time trial, National Under–23 Road Championships
 2nd Tour de Basse-Navarre
 3rd Circuit de l'Essor
 3rd Boucle de l'Artois
 3rd Tour d'Eure-et-Loir
2017
 5th Overall Tour du Poitou-Charentes
2020
 3rd Time trial, National Road Championships
2021
 2nd Time trial, National Road Championships
 2nd Overall Tour Poitou-Charentes en Nouvelle-Aquitaine
 3rd Mercan'Tour Classic Alpes-Maritimes 
2022
 1st  Time trial, National Road Championships
 5th Chrono des Nations
 10th Overall Tour de Pologne
 10th Time trial, UCI Road World Championships

Grand Tour general classification results timeline

References

External links

1994 births
Living people
French male cyclists
Sportspeople from Tarbes
Cyclists from Occitania (administrative region)
21st-century French people